This article shows the roster of all participating teams at the 2018 FIVB Volleyball Men's Nations League. The 16 national teams involved in the tournament were required to register a squad of 21 players, which every week's 14-player roster must be selected from. Each country must declare its 14-player roster two days before the start of each week's round-robin competition.

The following is the Argentine roster in the 2018 Men's Nations League.

Head coach: Julio Velasco

The following is the Australian roster in the 2018 Men's Nations League.

Head coach: Mark Lebedew

The following is the Brazilian roster in the 2018 Men's Nations League.

Head coach: Renan Dal Zotto

The following is the Bulgarian roster in the 2018 Men's Nations League.

Head coach: Plamen Konstantinov

The following is the Canadian roster in the 2018 Men's Nations League.

Head coach:  Stéphane Antiga

The following is the Chinese roster in the 2018 Men's Nations League.

Head coach:  Raúl Lozano

The following is the French roster in the 2018 Men's Nations League.

Head coach: Laurent Tillie

The following is the German roster in the 2018 Men's Nations League.

Head coach:  Andrea Giani

The following is the Iranian roster in the 2018 Men's Nations League.

Head coach:  Igor Kolaković

The following is the Italian roster in the 2018 Men's Nations League.

Head coach: Gianlorenzo Blengini

The following is the Japanese roster in the 2018 Men's Nations League.

Head coach: Yuichi Nakagaichi

The following is the Polish roster in the 2018 Men's Nations League.

Head coach:  Vital Heynen

The following is the Russian roster in the 2018 Men's Nations League.

Head coach: Sergey Shlyapnikov

The following is the Serbian roster in the 2018 Men's Nations League.

Head coach: Nikola Grbić

The following is the Korean roster in the 2018 Men's Nations League.

Head coach: Kim Ho-chul

The following is the American roster in the 2018 Men's Nations League.

Head coach: John Speraw

References

External links
FIVB Volleyball Nations League 2018 – official website

FIVB Volleyball Men's Nations League
2018
2018 in men's volleyball